Chhulthim Dolma Gurung(born 8 September 1986) is an Nepali actress who works in Nepali films. She ventured into acting in The movie ‘November Rain (2014 film)’  as A character "Dalli" which was released on April 24, 2014. For the former film, she won NFDC National Film Awards 2015, 8th NEFTA Film Awards in 2015 And  Dcine Awards 2015 in the category of 'The Best Actor in a Supporting Role (Female) '.

Filmography

References

External links 

Chhulthim Dolma Gurung at Instagram

Nepalese film actresses
Actresses in Nepali cinema
21st-century Nepalese actresses
Nepalese female models
Nepalese television actresses
Actresses in Nepali television
Actors from Kathmandu
Nepalese stage actresses
People from Solukhumbu District
Gurung people
Living people
1986 births